The men's sabre was a competition in fencing at the 2004 Summer Olympics in Athens. A total of 39 men from 21 nations competed in this event. Nations had been limited to three fencers each since 1928. Competition took place in the Fencing Hall at the Helliniko Olympic Complex on August 14. The event was won by Aldo Montano of Italy, the nation's first victory in the men's sabre since 1920 (and second overall). Montano accomplished what his grandfather (Aldo Montano) and father (Mario Aldo Montano), both world champions in the individual event and Olympic medalists in the team competition, had not been able to: Olympic gold in the individual event. Zsolt Nemcsik of Hungary took silver while Vladislav Tretiak earned Ukraine's first medal in the event with his bronze. France's five-Games medal streak ended.

Background

This was the 25th appearance of the event, which is the only fencing event to have been held at every Summer Olympics. Four of the quarterfinalists from 2000 returned: gold medalist Mihai Covaliu of Romania, bronze medalist Wiradech Kothny of Germany, fourth-place finisher Domonkos Ferjancsik of Hungary, and fifth-place finisher (and 1996 bronze medalist) Damien Touya of France. The favorites were Russia's Stanislav Pozdnyakov (1996 gold medalist and 1997, 2001, and 2002 world champion) and Ukraine's Volodymyr Lukashenko (2003 world champion).

The Republic of the Congo made its debut in the men's sabre. Italy made its 23rd appearance in the event, most of any nation, having missed the inaugural 1896 event and the 1904 Games.

Competition format

The 1996 tournament had vastly simplified the competition format into a single-elimination bracket, with a bronze medal match. The 2004 tournament continued to use that format. Bouts were to 15 touches. Standard sabre rules regarding target area, striking, and priority were used.

Schedule

All times are Greece Standard Time (UTC+2)

Results

Preliminary round

As there were more than 32 entrants in this event, seven first round matches were held to reduce the field to 32 fencers.

Main tournament bracket

The remaining field of 32 fencers competed in a single-elimination tournament to determine the medal winners. Semifinal losers proceeded to a bronze medal match.

Final classification

References

Yahoo! Sports Athens 2004 Summer Olympics Fencing Results

Men's sabre
Men's events at the 2004 Summer Olympics